The Coordination Group for Meteorological Satellites (CGMS) is an international organization created in 1972 to coordinate the satellite systems that support global operational meteorology.

Description 
CGMS came into being on 19 September 1972, when representatives of the European Space Research Organisation (since 1975 the European Space Agency), Japan, the United States of America, and observers from the World Meteorological Organisation (WMO) and the Joint Planning Staff for the Global Atmospheric Research Programme, met in Washington to discuss questions of compatibility among geostationary meteorological satellites. Since the formation the mandate of CGMS has been extended to include Low Earth Orbit meteorological satellites and to cover other areas of operational space-based environmental monitoring as well as space weather observations from satellites.

The objectives of CGMS are formally laid down in its charter

As of 2021 CGMS has as members 14 national and intergovernmental space agencies, as well as the World Meteorological Organisation and the Intergovernmental Oceanographic Commission:

CGMS activities 

CGMS coordinates the operational satellite systems of its members in an end-to-end fashion as required to facilitate and develop shared access to and use of satellite data and products in various application area, including operational meteorology. The activities cover: 

 Operational Continuity and Contingency Planning
 Coordination of Satellite Systems, Frequencies and Operations
 Coordination of Data Access and End User Support
 Enhancement of the quality of satellite-derived data and Products
 Monitoring of Climate including Greenhouse Gases
 Space Weather Monitoring
 Outreach and training activities

The medium term targets of CGMS are reflected in the CGMS High-Level Priority Plan. The HLPP is a rolling 5-year plan, revised annually by the CGMS plenary session.

References

External links
 

Weather satellites
International scientific organizations